The 1972 United States Senate election in New Jersey was held on November 7, 1972. Incumbent Republican Clifford P. Case defeated Democratic nominee Paul J. Krebs with 62.46% of the vote.

Primary elections were held on June 6. Case turned away a challenge from James Ralph. Krebs won a large plurality in the Democratic primary over Daniel Gaby and Joseph Karcher.

, this was the last time the Republicans won a U.S. Senate election in New Jersey.

Republican primary

Candidates
Clifford P. Case, incumbent United States Senator
James W. Ralph

Results

Democratic primary

Candidates
Daniel M. Gaby, advertising executive and chair of the Democratic Policy Council
Joseph T. Karcher, Sayreville Borough Attorney and former State Assemblyman
Henry Kielbasa, railroad worker
Paul J. Krebs, former U.S. Representative from Livingston

Withdrawn
Patrick McGahn, chair of the Atlantic County Democratic Committee

Declined
Edward Crabiel, Minority Leader of the New Jersey Senate

Campaign
Krebs ran with the support of organized labor and the Hubert Humphrey presidential campaign, while Gaby ran as a reform candidate and aligned himself with George McGovern's campaign.

Results
Although McGovern won the state's presidential preference primary easily, Krebs defeated Gaby by roughly 50,000 votes.

General election

Candidates
Clifford Case, incumbent Senator since 1955 (Republican)
A. Howard Freund, (American)
Paul J. Krebs, former U.S. Representative from Livingston (Democratic)
Jules Levin, candidate for U.S. Senate in 1966 (Socialist Labor)
Charles W. Wiley, (Independent)

Campaign
From the start of the post-primary campaign, Krebs faced "virtually insurmountable political odds."

Results

Notes

References

1972
New Jersey
United States Senate